Martin Gleeson (born 25 May 1980) is the assistant attack coach at the rugby union club; Wasps RFC. He is the former assistant coach at the rugby league club Salford Red Devils in the Super League, and an English former professional rugby league footballer. His previous clubs include the Huddersfield Giants, St. Helens (Heritage No. 1114), the Warrington Wolves (Heritage No. 1056), the Wigan Warriors (Heritage No. 1014), Hull F.C. (Heritage No.) and the Salford City Reds. His honours include winning the Super League in 2002 and 2010 and the Challenge Cup in 2004.

Gleeson was banned for three years (with half being suspended) in 2011 for failing a drugs test. His ban expired on 12 November 2012.

Early life

Gleeson was born in Wigan. Much of his early rugby development took place in Australia, where he emigrated with his family at age 10 to live in Queensland, where he played his junior rugby league for the Slacks Creek Red Lions club based in Daisy Hill, Queensland. He also played alongside future Australian and Queensland representative Brad Meyers at Brothers St. Paul, in Brisbane. In 2005, Gleeson revealed his desire to represent Queensland in State of Origin. He returned to England aged 17 and embarked on a professional career, signing for Huddersfield Giants in 1999.

Playing career

Huddersfield Giants (1999–2001)

After three seasons with the Giants, he left the club following their relegation from Super League in 2001, and signed for St Helens.

St. Helens (2002–2004)
Gleeson made his début for Great Britain against Australia in Sydney in July 2002, also participating in the test series against New Zealand at the end of the season.

Injury lay off disrupted him in 2003. Although he missed seven games between July and September, he came back at the end of the 2003's Super League VIII to win back his place in the Great Britain squad after a fine performance for England 'A' against the touring Australians.

He opened the 2004's Super League IX for St. Helens, and won the Challenge Cup against the Wigan Warriors at the Millennium Stadium, Cardiff. He and teammate Sean Long were later involved in a betting scandal that saw both players fined and suspended for the last four months of the 2004's Super League IX.

Gleeson was selected in the Great Britain team to compete in the end of season 2004 Rugby League Tri-Nations tournament.

Warrington Wolves (2005–2009)

Gleeson was also heavily involved in providing scores for his  partner, New Zealand international Henry Fa'afili.

In September 2008 he was named in the England training squad for the 2008 Rugby League World Cup, and in October 2008 he was named in the final 24-man England squad.

He was chosen for the England team to face Wales at the Keepmoat Stadium, Doncaster prior to England's departure for the 2008 Rugby League World Cup.

Gleeson signed a two-year extension until 2011. However, on 4 April 2009 he signed for local rivals, Wigan, on a 3½-year contract.

Wigan Warriors (2009–2011)

Seven rounds into the 2009's Super League XIV, with both Warrington Wolves and Wigan Warriors at the time drifting outside of play-off positions, Gleeson was transferred to the Wigan Warriors on a 3½-year contract, with  Richie Mathers moving the other direction. Gleeson was an integral part of Wigan Warriors' 2010's Super League XV, scoring two tries as they claimed the 2010 Super League Grand Final victory over St. Helens at Old Trafford.

His start of 2011's Super League XVI came against St. Helens in the first regular round. He also featured in the side's win at the Bradford Bulls but had to be taken off in the first-half due to a hamstring injury. He recovered in time for the World Club Challenge fixture against St George Illawarra Dragons, but was ineffective and again had to be withdrawn during the match due to the injury. Prior to the match, the Manchester Evening News reported that in December 2010, Gleeson had contacted the police alleging he was the victim of blackmail but had decided to drop the charge. Amid growing speculation, the club released a statement saying he had left his hometown club with immediate effect citing his injury, disciplinary problems and a "serious distraction in his personal life" as the reasons for the departure.

Hull F.C. (2011)
Gleeson signed for Super League club Hull F.C. on Thursday 15 April 2011 on an 18-month contract, keeping him at the club until the end of the 2012's Super League XVII. He made a try scoring début in the 36–18 thrashing of bitter city rivals Hull Kingston Rovers in the Good Friday derby at the KC Stadium. In June it was announced that Gleeson was suffering a stress related illness and he was granted leave by the club. His contract with the club was terminated in September. In December it was announced that Gleeson had failed a drugs test on 13 May in a game against Salford in which he scored two tries. He was subsequently banned for 3 years (with half being suspended) from 12 June which was his final game for the club against Harlequins.

Salford City Reds (2013–14)
In November 2012, Salford City Reds announced they had signed Gleeson on a 2-year contract for the 2013–14 and 2014–15 seasons. Gleeson scored his first try for Salford in the Magic Weekend fixture against Widnes Vikings on 26 May 2013 at the Etihad Stadium, Manchester.

Gleeson announced his retirement in September 2014.

Genealogical information
Martin Gleeson is the older brother of the rugby league footballer; Mark Gleeson, and the cousin of the rugby league footballer; Sean Gleeson.

References

External links
Wigan Warriors profile
Profile at warringtonwolves.com
Statistics at wigan.rlfans.com
Profile at wiganwarriorsfans.com
Profile at saints.org.uk

1980 births
Living people
Doping cases in rugby league
England national rugby league team players
English rugby league players
English sportspeople in doping cases
Great Britain national rugby league team players
Huddersfield Giants players
Hull F.C. players
Lancashire rugby league team players
Rugby league centres
Rugby league five-eighths
Rugby league players from Wigan
Salford Red Devils captains
Salford Red Devils players
St Helens R.F.C. players
Warrington Wolves players
Wigan Warriors players